Pincushion moss may refer to several different species of plants, including:

 Asclepias oenotheroides
 Dicranoweisia crispula, the mountain pincushion
 Borya sphaerocephala
 Leptostomum inclinans
 Leucobryum glaucum